The Clack House is a historic house at 725 East Dogwood Lane in Fayetteville, Arkansas.  The Prairie School house was designed by John G. Williams, then a professor of architecture at the University of Arkansas at Fayetteville and founder of its architecture department, and was built in 1954–56.  The house was designed for the Clacks with energy efficiency in mind, using hollow cavity masonry walls, while providing expansive views of the city from many windows.

The house was listed on the National Register of Historic Places in 2006.

See also
National Register of Historic Places listings in Washington County, Arkansas

References

Houses on the National Register of Historic Places in Arkansas
Prairie School architecture in Arkansas
Houses completed in 1954
Houses in Fayetteville, Arkansas
National Register of Historic Places in Fayetteville, Arkansas